FC Herisau  are a Swiss football team currently playing in 2. Liga Interregional,
the fourth tier in the Swiss football pyramid Group 5. The club was formed in 1906.
They finished 2008/2009 season in 11th position just avoiding relegation .

Staff and board members
 President: Marc Wäspi
 Vice President: Ueli  Fischer
 Secretary: Stefan  Nef
 Treasurer: Marianne Bauer
 Manager: Sven Ullmann

External links
 Official Website   

Association football clubs established in 1906
Football clubs in Switzerland
Herisau
1906 establishments in Switzerland